The Dakota Territory during the American Civil War raised only a battalion of cavalry, 2 companies, for three year service for the Union. They remained in the territory for defense of the frontier lands during the Dakota War.

See also 
Lists of American Civil War Regiments by State

References

Bibliography 
 Dyer, Frederick H. (1959). A Compendium of the War of the Rebellion. New York and London. Thomas Yoseloff, Publisher. 

Dakota Territory